José Israel Martínez Salas (born 14 March 1981) is a Mexican former professional footballer who played as a midfielder. He was recently brought back to the team that saw him grow up, América, after playing for 5 years with San Luis.

International Caps
As of 9 July 2009

References

1981 births
Living people
Mexican footballers
Mexico international footballers
Liga MX players
Club América footballers
San Luis F.C. players
Querétaro F.C. footballers
Atlante F.C. footballers
CONCACAF Gold Cup-winning players
2009 CONCACAF Gold Cup players
Association football midfielders